= Alexander Kazamias =

Greek politician

Alexander Kazamias is a Greek politician who is a member of the Hellenic Parliament.
